The Sir Harry and Lady Djanogly Learning Resource Centre (or the Djanogly LRC) is a library on the Jubilee Campus of the University of Nottingham, England.

The library houses books and resources relating to courses and research in the university’s Faculty of Education and School of Computing Science, and also houses the Commonwealth Education Documentation Centre. Since the summer of 2009 the library has also held all adult education course books previously kept at the Shakespeare Street library in Nottingham city centre after it was closed down as part of a money saving plan.

The library is an unusual circular building situated on an island platform in the middle of the campus lake. It was designed by the architect Sir Michael Hopkins, with the striking feature of having only a single floor, which spirals its way up and around the circumference of the building.

The library was named after the philanthropists Sir Harry and Lady Djanogly who gave a significant contribution towards the cost of its construction. Sir Harry Djanogly is the father of Jonathan Djanogly, who became MP for Huntingdon in 2001.

See also
Djanogly City Academy
Solomon R. Guggenheim Museum

References

External links

Djanogly Learning Resource Centre
University of Nottingham Information Services
Harry Djanogly's Official Site

University of Nottingham
Libraries in Nottinghamshire